This is a list of rulers and office-holders of the United Kingdom of Great Britain and Northern Ireland and predecessor states.

Heads of state 

List of English monarchs
List of Scottish monarchs
List of rulers of Wales
List of British monarchs

Heads of government 
Prime Minister of the United Kingdom (1721–present)
List of prime ministers of the United Kingdom

Ministers 
Cabinet of the United Kingdom
Chancellor of the Exchequer (1559–present)
Secretary of State for Northern Ireland (1972–present)
Secretary of State for Foreign and Commonwealth Affairs (1968–present)
Secretary of State for the Colonies (1768–1782; 1794–1801; 1854–1966)
Secretary of State for India (1858–1947)
Secretary of State for the Southern Department (1660–1782)
Secretary of State for the Northern Department (1660–1782)
Secretary of State for the Home Department (1782–present)
Secretary of State for Foreign Affairs (1782–1968)
Secretary of State for War (1794–1801; 1854–1964)
Secretary of State for War and the Colonies (1801–1854)
Secretary of State for Air (1918–1964)
Secretary of State for Defence (1964–present)
Secretary of State for Dominion Affairs (1925–1947)
Secretary of State for Commonwealth Relations (1947–1966)
Secretary of State for Commonwealth Affairs (1966–1968)
Secretary of State for Scotland (1926–present)
Secretary of State for Wales (1964–present)
Secretary of State for Economic Affairs (1964–1969)
Secretary of State for International Development (1970–1979, 1997–2020)
Secretary of State for Work and Pensions (1970–present)
Secretary of State for Education and Skills (and preceding positions, 1902–present)
Secretary of State for Employment (and preceding positions, 1916–present)
Secretary of State for Transport (and preceding positions, 1924–present)
Secretary of State for Culture, Media and Sport (and preceding positions, 1992–present)
Secretary of State for Northern Ireland (1972–present)
Secretary of State for the Environment (1970–1997)
Secretary of State for the Environment, Transport and the Regions (1997–2001)
Secretary of State for Environment, Food and Rural Affairs (2001–present)
Secretary of State for Exiting the European Union (2016–2020)
Lord Chancellor (1068–present)
Lord President of the Council (1678–present)
Lord Keeper of the Privy Seal (1307–present)
Minister of Agriculture, Fisheries and Food (and preceding positions, 1889–2001)
Minister of Technology (1964–1970)
First Lord of the Admiralty (1709–1964) 
Paymaster General (1834–present)
Master-General of the Ordnance (1544–1855)
President of the Board of Trade (1696–1782; 1784–present)
Chancellor of the Duchy of Lancaster (1413–present)
Postmaster General (1823–1968)
Paymaster of the Forces (1661–1836)
Master-General of the Ordnance (1544–1855)
Master of the Mint (1572–1869)
Treasurer of the Navy (1544–1836)
Secretary at War (1661–1863)
First Commissioner of Woods and Forests (1810–1851)
First Commissioner of Works (1851–1937)
President of the Poor Law Board (1834–1871)
President of the Local Government Board (1871–1919)
Secretary for Scotland (1885–1926)
HM Treasury
Lord Treasurers (1126–1714)
First Lord of the Treasury (1714–1905)
Commissioners of the Treasury (1714–present)

Parliament office-holders 
Leader of the House of Commons (1721–present)
Members of Parliament elected in 2001
Members of Parliament elected in 2005
Members of Parliament elected in 2010
Members of the House of Lords

State office-holders

Great Officers of State 
Lord High Steward
Lord High Constable
Lord Great Chamberlain
Earl Marshal
Keeper of the Great Seal of Scotland
Keeper of the Privy Seal of Scotland
Lord Clerk Register
Lord Lyon King of Arms

Officers of the Royal Household 
Lord Steward
Lord Chamberlain
Historiographer Royal
Astronomer Royal for Scotland
Sculptor in Ordinary for Scotland
 HM Painter and Limner for Scotland
Her Majesty's Botanist

Legal Officers 
Attorney General for England and Wales
Solicitor General for England and Wales
Lord Advocate
Solicitor General for Scotland
Advocate General for Scotland
Counsel General for Wales
 Attorney General for Northern Ireland

Court office-holders 
Lord Chief Justice
Master of the Rolls
Chief Justice of the Court of Common Pleas (to 1873)
Chief Baron of the Exchequer (to 1873)
Lord Justice General
Lord Justice Clerk
Lords Justice of Appeal of England and Wales
Lords Justice of Appeal of Northern Ireland
Senators of the College of Justice

Heads of devolved administrations

Northern Ireland 
 Lord Lieutenant of Ireland  (1171–1922)
Governors of Northern Ireland (1922–1972) (Abolished under the Northern Ireland Constitution Act 1973)
Prime Minister of Northern Ireland (1922–1972)
Secretaries of State for Northern Ireland (1972– 1998, 2002–2007)
 First Minister and Deputy First Minister [1998–2002, 2007–present]
County Court Judges of Northern Ireland
Members of the Northern Ireland Assembly [1998–2002, 2007–present]

Scotland 
Members of the Scottish Parliament
First Minister of Scotland
List of Scottish Governments

Wales 
Members of the Senedd
Welsh Government
First Minister for Wales

Heads of colonies and overseas territories 
British Crown dependencies
Overseas territories of the United Kingdom

Crown dependencies

Isle of Man 
King of Mann
Lord of Mann
Governor of the Isle of Man
Lieutenant Governor of the Isle of Man

Channel Islands 
Guernsey: Bailiffs of Guernsey
Jersey: Bailiffs of Jersey
Sark: Seigneurs of Sark

Overseas territories

Anguilla 
Governors of Anguilla

Bermuda 
Governors of Bermuda

British Antarctic Territory 
Commissioners of the British Antarctic Territory

British Virgin Islands 
Colonial Heads of the British Virgin Islands
Presidents of the British Virgin Islands
Governors of the British Virgin Islands

Cayman Islands 
Governors of the Cayman Islands

Falkland Islands 
Governors of the Falkland Islands

Gibraltar 
Governors of Gibraltar
Chief Ministers of Gibraltar

Montserrat 
Governors of Montserrat

Pitcairn Islands 
Rulers of the Pitcairn Islands
Governors of Fiji
High Commissioners from the United Kingdom to New Zealand

Saint Helena 
Governors of Saint Helena

Turks and Caicos Islands 
Governors of the Turks and Caicos Islands

Nobility 

Duke of Devonshire
Tenants of Herm
Duke of Norfolk
Seigneurs of Sark
Tenants of Brecqhou
Rulers of Wales
Prince of Wales
Duke of York

Mayors 
Heads of London Government
List of Lord Mayors of London

Heads of former states 
Roman Governors of Britannia
Historical Kings of the Britons
Bretwalda (Overlord of the English kingdoms)
Kings of East Anglia
Kings of Essex
Kings of Hwicce
Kings of Kent
Kings of Lindsey
Kings of Mercia
Kings of Northumbria
Kings of Sussex
Kings of Wessex
Kings of Jorvik
Earls of York
Earls of Northumbria
Kings of Dál Riata
Kings of the Picts
Lords of Galloway
Rulers of Wales
Kings of Gwynedd
Kings of the Isle of Man and the Isles
Kings of the Isle of Man

See also 
 List of current heads of government in the United Kingdom and dependencies
 United Kingdom order of precedence

United Kingdom history-related lists
Lists of British people